Alexander Jagiellon (5 August 1461 – 19 August 1506) of the House of Jagiellon was the Grand Duke of Lithuania and later also King of Poland. He was the fourth son of Casimir IV Jagiellon. He was elected grand duke of Lithuania on the death of his father (1492) and king of Poland on the death of his brother John I Albert (1501).

Biography
Alexander was born as the fourth son of King Casimir IV of Poland and Elisabeth, daughter of the King Albert of Hungary. At the time of his father's death in 1492, his eldest brother Vladislaus had already become king of Bohemia (1471) and Hungary and Croatia (1490), and the next oldest brother, Casimir, had died (1484) after leading an ascetic and pious life in his final years, resulting in his eventual canonization. While the third oldest brother, John I Albert was chosen by the Polish nobility (szlachta) to be the next king of Poland, the Lithuanians instead elected Alexander to be their next grand duke.

The greatest challenge that Alexander faced upon assuming control of the grand duchy was an attack on Lithuania by Grand Duke Ivan III of Russia and his allies, the Tatars of the Crimean Khanate, which commenced shortly after his accession. Ivan III considered himself the heir to the lands of Kievan Rus', and was striving to take back the territory previously gained by Lithuania.  Unable to successfully stop the incursions, Alexander sent a delegation to Moscow to make a peace settlement, which was signed in 1494 and ceded extensive land over to Ivan. In an additional effort to instill a peace between the two countries, Alexander was betrothed to Helena, the daughter of Ivan III; they were married in Vilnius on 15 February 1495. The peace did not last long, however, as Ivan III resumed hostilities in 1500. The most Alexander could do was to garrison Smolensk and other strongholds and employ his wife Helena to mediate another truce between him and her father after the disastrous Battle of Vedrosha (1500). In the terms of this truce, Lithuania had to surrender about a third of its territory to the nascent expansionist Russian state.

On 17 June 1501, Alexander's older brother John I Albert died suddenly, and Alexander was crowned king of Poland on 12 December of that year. Alexander's shortage of funds immediately made him subservient to the Polish Senate and szlachta, who deprived him of control of the mint (then one of the most lucrative sources of revenue for the Polish kings), curtailed his prerogatives, and generally endeavored to reduce him to a subordinate position. In 1505, the Sejm passed the Act of Nihil novi, which forbade the king to issue laws without the consent of the nobility, represented by the two legislative chambers, except for laws governing royal cities, crown lands, mines, fiefdoms, royal peasants, and Jews. This was another step in Poland's progression towards a "Noble's Democracy".

During Alexander's reign, Poland suffered additional humiliation at the hands of her subject principality, Moldavia. Only the death of Stephen, the great hospodar of Moldavia, enabled Poland still to hold her own on the Danube River. Meanwhile, the liberality of Pope Julius II, who issued no fewer than 29 bulls in favor of Poland and granted Alexander Peter's Pence and other financial help, enabled him to restrain somewhat the arrogance of the Teutonic Order.

Alexander Jagiellon never felt at home in Poland, and bestowed his favor principally upon his fellow Lithuanians, the most notable of whom was the wealthy Lithuanian magnate Michael Glinski, who justified his master's confidence by his great victory over the Tatars at Kleck (5 August 1506), news of which was brought to Alexander on his deathbed in Vilnius.

Alexander was the last known ruler of the Gediminid dynasty to have maintained the family's ancestral Lithuanian language. After his death, Polish became the sole language of the family, thus fully Polonising the Jagiellons.

In 1931, during the refurbishment of Vilnius Cathedral, the forgotten sarcophagus of Alexander was discovered, and has since been put on display.

Gallery

See also

 History of Poland (1385–1569)
Rachela Fiszel
 Sejm walny
 St. Anne's Church, Vilnius

References

External links

 Pages and Forums on the Lithuanian History

1461 births
1506 deaths
16th-century monarchs in Europe
16th-century Polish monarchs
Polish Roman Catholics
Jagiellonian dynasty
Grand Dukes of Lithuania
Gediminids
Burials at Vilnius Cathedral
Nobility from Kraków